Holmes & Watson. Madrid days  is a 2012 Spanish thriller film written, produced and directed  by José Luis Garci. It stars Gary Piquer as Sherlock Holmes and José Luis García Pérez as Dr. Watson.
The plot brings the characters of Sherlock Holmes and  Dr. Watson to Madrid in order to investigate crimes similar to those of Jack the Ripper.

Parts of it were filmed on the Buen Retiro Park in Madrid.

Cast
 Gary Piquer as Sherlock Holmes
 José Luis García Pérez as Dr. Watson
 Belén López as Irene Adler
 Víctor Clavijo as Josito
 Inocencio Arias as a minister
 Enrique Villén as Enrique Valcárcel
 Alberto Ruiz-Gallardón as Isaac Albéniz
 Manuela Velasco as Elena
 Macarena Gómez as Berna
 Manuel Tejada as Marqués de Simancas
 Candela Arroyo as a dancer
 Juan Antonio Muñoz as Don Fernando
 Leticia Dolera a Mary Watson
 Jorge Roelas as Luis Delgado.

Reception
Jonathan Holland for Variety praised the decor and detail of the film but said "dramatically, it’s cardboard."

References

External links
 
 

2012 films
Spanish thriller films
2010s Spanish-language films
Sherlock Holmes films
Films with screenplays by José Luis Garci
2012 thriller films
Films directed by José Luis Garci
2010s Spanish films